Nesholmen Island is a small island lying  off Djupvikneset Peninsula in southern Lützow-Holm Bay. Mapped by Norwegian cartographers from air photos taken by the Lars Christensen Expedition, 1936–37, and named Nesholmen (the ness islet) because of its proximity to Djupvikneset Peninsula.

See also 
 List of antarctic and sub-antarctic islands

Islands of Queen Maud Land
Prince Harald Coast